Halkapınar literally means ringed river. It may be the following:

Halkapınar, Çınar
Halkapınar, Konya, a town in Konya
Halkapınar Transfer Center, a large multimodal transportation center in İzmir. 
Halkapınar Facility, a maintenance facility and depot for the İzmir Metro